Buakiew Sitsongpeenong, is a Thai Muay Thai fighter.

Career
On March 18, 2017 Buakiew faced Nattakiat Phran26 at the Omnoi Stadium as part of the Isuzu Cup. He lost the fight by knockout in the fourth round.

On June 2, 2017 Buakiew faced Aroondej M16 at the Lumpinee Stadium. He lost the fight by decision.

On July 28, 2017 Buakiew faced Julio Lobo for the vacant WPMF World 147 lbs title. He won the fight by decision.

On September 1, 2017 Buakiew faced Fahsura Windy Sport for the vacant Lumpinee Stadium 154 lbs title. He won the fight by decision.

On November 30, 2017 Buakiew faced Sibmuen Sitchefboontham at the Omnoi Stadium. He won the fight by decision.

On February 27, 2017 Buakiew faced Bobo Sacko for the vacant WBC Muaythai World 147 lbs title. He won the fight by technical knockout with a body kick in the fourth round. 

On April 1, 2018 Buakiew took part in the a Real Hero 8-man one night tournament. In quarter finals he defeated Pavel Grishanovich by decision before losing to Bobirjon Tagaev by decision in the semi finals.

On September 19, 2018 Buakiew faced Sibmuen Sitchefboontham at Rajadamnern Stadium. He won the fight by knockout with knees to the body in round 4.

Titles and accomplishments
Lumpinee Stadium
 2017 Lumpinee Stadium 154 lbs Champion

World Boxing Council
 2018 WBC Muay Thai World Welterweight Champion

World Profesional Muaythai Federation
 2017 WPMF World Welterweight Champion

Muay Thai record

|-  bgcolor="#fbb"
| 2019-11-17|| Loss ||align=left| Victor Almeida || Muay Thai Super Champ || Bangkok, Thailand || Decision || 3||3:00

|-  style="background:#fbb;"
| 2019-03-17|| Loss ||align=left| Singmanee Kaewsamrit || Miracle Muay Thai Festival, Final || Phra Nakhon Si Ayutthaya (city), Thailand || KO || 1 ||

|-  style="background:#CCFFCC;"
| 2019-03-17|| Win ||align=left| Abderrezzaq Djaadane || Miracle Muay Thai Festival, Semi Final || Phra Nakhon Si Ayutthaya (city), Thailand || Decision || 3 || 3:00

|-  style="background:#fbb;"
| 2019-01-10 || Loss ||align=left| Sakmongkol Sor.Sommai || Sor.Sommai, Rajadamnern Stadium || Bangkok, Thailand || KO (Left Elbow) || 3 ||

|-  bgcolor="#fbb"
| 2018-12-15|| Loss ||align=left| Em Lengly || Kun Khmer SEA TV  || Cambodia || TKO (Doctor stoppage) || 2||1:10

|-  bgcolor="#c5d2ea"
| 2018-11-25|| Draw||align=left| Meun Sophea || Khmer Warrior Bayon TV || Cambodia || Decision || 5||3:00

|-  style="background:#fbb;"
| 2018-09-19 || Loss||align=left| Sibmuen Sitchefboontham || Rajadamnern Stadium || Bangkok, Thailand || KO (Knees)|| 4 ||

|-  bgcolor="#fbb"
| 2018-07-27|| Loss ||align=left| Vong Noy || Khmer Warrior Bayon TV || Cambodia || KO (Elbow) || 2||1:10

|-  bgcolor="#cfc"
| 2018-07-15|| Win ||align=left| Walid Otamne || Muay Thai Super Champ || Bangkok, Thailand || Decision || 3||3:00

|-  style="background:#fbb;"
| 2018-04-01 || Loss||align=left| Bobirjon Tagaev || Real Hero, Tournament Semi Final || Bangkok, Thailand || Decision || 1 ||5:00

|-  style="background:#cfc;"
| 2018-04-01 || Win||align=left| Pavel Grishanovich || Real Hero, Tournament Quarter Final || Bangkok, Thailand || Decision || 1 ||5:00

|-  bgcolor="#cfc"
| 2018-02-27|| Win ||align=left| Bobo Sacko || Best Of Siam XII, Lumpinee Stadium || Bangkok, Thailand || TKO (Body kick) || 4||
|-
! style=background:white colspan=9 |

|-  style="background:#fbb;"
| 2018-01-17 || Loss ||align=left| Sibmuen Sitchefboontham || Rajadamnern Stadium || Bangkok, Thailand || KO (Left Elbow) || 3 ||

|-  style="background:#cfc;"
| 2017-11-30 || Win ||align=left| Sibmuen Sitchefboontham || Rajadamnern Stadium || Bangkok, Thailand || Decision|| 5 || 3:00

|-  style="background:#cfc;"
| 2017-09-30|| Win ||align=left| Sasha Moisa || All Star Fight 2 || Bangkok, Thailand || Decision || 3 || 3:00

|-  bgcolor="#cfc"
| 2017-09-01|| Win ||align=left| Fahsura WindySport || Lumpinee Stadium || Bangkok, Thailand || Decision ||5||3:00
|-
! style=background:white colspan=9 |

|-  style="background:#cfc;"
| 2017-07-28|| Win|| align="left" | Julio Lobo || King's Birthday || Thailand || Decision|| 5 || 3:00  
|-
! style=background:white colspan=9 |

|-  bgcolor="#fbb"
| 2017-06-02|| Loss ||align=left| Aroondej M16 || Lumpinee Stadium || Bangkok, Thailand || Decision ||5||3:00

|-  style="background:#fbb;"
| 2017-03-18|| Loss ||align=left| Nattakiat Phran26 || Omnoi Stadium - Isuzu Cup|| Samut Sakhon, Thailand || KO (Left cross)|| 4 || 

|-  style="background:#cfc;"
| 2017-01-28|| Win ||align=left|  Phetwanlop Sitsongpeenong  || Omnoi Stadium - Isuzu Cup|| Samut Sakhon, Thailand || KO || 2 || 

|-  style="background:#fbb"
| 2016-11-19|| Loss ||align=left| Duangsompong Nayok A Tasala || Omnoi Stadium - Isuzu Cup || Samut Sakhon, Thailand || Decision || 5 || 3:00

|-  style="background:#cfc;"
| 2016-09-17|| Win ||align=left| Phetwanlop Sitsongpeenong || Omnoi Stadium - Isuzu Cup || Samut Sakhon, Thailand || Decision || 5 || 3:00

|-  style="background:#cfc;"
| 2016-08-27|| Win ||align=left| Saenphet Kiatphetnoi || Omnoi Stadium || Samut Sakhon, Thailand || Decision || 5 || 3:00

|-  style="background:#fbb;"
| 2016-07-16|| Loss ||align=left| Suayngarm Pumphanmuang  || Omnoi Stadium || Samut Sakhon, Thailand || Decision || 5 || 3:00

|-  style="background:#cfc;"
| 2016-04-17|| Win ||align=left| Vladimir Konsky || Super Muay Thai || Bangkok, Thailand || Decision || 3 || 3:00

|-  style="background:#cfc;"
| 2016-03-13|| Win ||align=left| Sliman Zegnoun || Super Muay Thai || Bangkok, Thailand || Decision || 3 || 3:00

|-  style="background:#fbb;"
| 2015-05-12|| Loss ||align=left| Tobias Alexandersson || Super Muay Thai || Bangkok, Thailand || Decision || 3 || 3:00

|-
| colspan=9 | Legend:

References

Buakiew Sitsongpeenong
Living people
1993 births